Cottonwood is a town in Houston County, Alabama, United States. One source said the town incorporated in 1901, although the 1910 U.S. Census stated 1903. It is part of the Dothan, Alabama Metropolitan Statistical Area. At the 2010 census the population was 1,289, up from 1,170 in 2000.

Geography
Cottonwood is located in southern Houston County at  (31.053646, -85.302409). Alabama State Route 53 passes through the center of town, leading north  to Dothan and southeast  to the Florida state line.

Demographics

2000 census
At the 2000 census there were 1,170 people, 485 households, and 323 families in the town. The racial makeup of the town was 69.06% White, 29.06% Black or African American, 0.68% Native American, and 1.20% from two or more races. 1.97% of the population were Hispanic or Latino of any race.
Of the 485 households 29.3% had children under the age of 18 living with them, 48.2% were married couples living together, 14.2% had a female householder with no husband present, and 33.2% were non-families. 30.5% of households were one person and 15.5% were one person aged 65 or older. The average household size was 2.41 and the average family size was 3.01.

The age distribution was 26.5% under the age of 18, 7.1% from 18 to 24, 25.0% from 25 to 44, 24.5% from 45 to 64, and 16.9% 65 or older. The median age was 38 years. For every 100 females, there were 90.6 males. For every 100 females age 18 and over, there were 86.1 males.

The median household income was $21,452 and the median family income  was $32,065. Males had a median income of $25,833 versus $15,515 for females. The per capita income for the town was $13,111. About 18.1% of families and 27.2% of the population were below the poverty line, including 28.8% of those under age 18 and 42.1% of those age 65 or over.

2010 census
At the 2010 census there were 1,289 people, 553 households, and 350 families in the town. The racial makeup of the town was 71.8% White, 25.4% Black or African American, 0.6% Native American, and 1.9% from two or more races. 1.1% of the population were Hispanic or Latino of any race.
Of the 553 households 24.4% had children under the age of 18 living with them, 42.0% were married couples living together, 16.1% had a female householder with no husband present, and 36.7% were non-families. 33.5% of households were one person and 13.9% were one person aged 65 or older. The average household size was 2.33 and the average family size was 2.99.

The age distribution was 22.5% under the age of 18, 9.2% from 18 to 24, 22.2% from 25 to 44, 29.2% from 45 to 64, and 16.9% 65 or older. The median age was 42.4 years. For every 100 females, there were 87.9 males. For every 100 females age 18 and over, there were 86.4 males.

The median household income was $26,570 and the median family income  was $27,465. Males had a median income of $28,942 versus $27,857 for females. The per capita income for the town was $15,090. About 26.1% of families and 28.0% of the population were below the poverty line, including 38.5% of those under age 18 and 13.5% of those age 65 or over.

2020 census

As of the 2020 United States census, there were 1,048 people, 494 households, and 305 families residing in the town.

Notable people
Pete Coachman, former Major League Baseball player (California Angels)
Emmett Ripley Cox, Senior Judge of the United States Court of Appeals for the Eleventh Circuit
Curtis McGriff, former defensive lineman for the New York Giants of the National Football League
Katherine Reid, born in Cottonwood in about 1901, performed stage shows as the Lady Alligator Wrestler in the 1930s before retiring. But in 1968, at age 67, she came out of retirement to appear on Rowan and Martin's Laugh-In.

References

External links

Towns in Houston County, Alabama
Towns in Alabama
Dothan metropolitan area, Alabama